Barbara Mertens (21 May 1968 – 4 June 2021) was a Belgian journalist and television presenter.

Biography
Mertens earned her license in journalism from the Université libre de Bruxelles and became Editor-in-Chief of the radio network Bel RTL in 2009 and presented the program Bel-RTL Matin weekly alongside Thomas Van Hamme until 2014. She also presented television programs with RTL-TVI.

Barbara Mertens died on 4 June 2021 at the age of 53.

References

1968 births
2021 deaths
Belgian women journalists
21st-century Belgian journalists
Belgian television presenters
Université libre de Bruxelles alumni
RTL Group people
People from Uccle
Belgian women television presenters